Julis ( Jūlis,  G'ulis) is a Druze village and local council in the Northern District of Israel.

Etymology
According to local legend, the name is derived from "Julius," the name of a Roman commander who camped in the area. Others say it is from the Arabic word for "sitting" - "jalis", as it is located on lower hills than the surrounding villages, and thus seems to be sitting.

History
Julis was a Jewish village in Talmudic times and had a Jewish presence in the Late Middle Ages (14th-16th centuries). In 1388, Sa'adia Ben Ya'akov copied "The Sufficient Guide" by the Tanhum of Jerusalem, "in the town of Julis... near Acre."

Ottoman period
According to the 1596 Ottoman tax records Julis had a predominantly Muslim (Druze?) population, with a total of 79 households. The taxable produce comprised wheat, barley, "summer crops", fruit trees, and "goats and bees". Julis also had a press for olive oil or grape syrup. Total taxes were 7,047 akçe. During the 16th century there was also a small Jewish population.

In the early part of the 18th century Julis was one of the major cotton producing villages in the area. Later in the same century it was one of five villages in nahiya ("subdistrict") Sahil Akka (Acre coast), which were owned directly by the governor of Acre, and were exempt from the usual Ottoman taxes.

A map by Pierre Jacotin from Napoleon's invasion of 1799 showed the place, named as Gioules.

In 1875, the French explorer Victor Guérin visited the village, which he called Djoules. He noted that "before arriving at Julis I came upon a small plateau pierced by many
cisterns. The cisterns and the cut stones which are built up in the modern houses show that
the place is the site of an ancient town or village. On a neighbouring hill a waly is consecrated to the Sheikh Aly.'" In 1881, the PEF's  Survey of Western Palestine  described Julis as "a village built of stone containing about 200 Druzes, surrounded by olives and arable land."

A population list from about 1887 showed that Julis had 360 inhabitants; all Druze.

British Mandate
In the 1922 census of Palestine, conducted by the British Mandate authorities, Jules had a total population of 446 residents; 442 Druzes, 3 Christians and 1 Muslim. All the Christians were Orthodox. In the 1931 census it had increased to a population of 614; 586 Druse, 26 Christians, and 2 Muslims, in a total of 123 houses.

In the 1945 statistics the population of Julis was 820; 40 Christians and 780 classified as others (i.e. Druze), and the total land area was 14,708 dunams, according to an official land and population survey. Of this, 1,347 dunams were plantations and irrigable land, 6,568 used for cereals, while 63 dunams were built-up (urban) land.

Israel
Julis was captured by the Israeli army during Operation Dekel, 8–14 July 1948. Unlike many of the neighboring villages the inhabitants remained in their homes.
 
In 1967, Julis achieved local council status. The head of the council was Salman Hino. At the end of 2007, the town had 5,400 residents. The annual population growth rate was 1.8%. The residents are Druze.

In 2000, a high percentage (72.1%, compared to 60.3% in Tel Aviv) of all high school students received a matriculation certificate. The mean income was NIS 5,067 per month (2007), compared to a national average of NIS 6,743.

Landmarks 

 Druze Center House
Maqam Shaykh al-Farsi - Located to the south of the old village, consisting of two older buildings and a domed one. In an open area there are two cenotaphs with inscriptions which record the life of Shaykh al-Farsi. His date of death is given as 1167 H (1753-1754 C.E.). According to an inscription, the construction of the maqam (shrine) started in August, 1754.
Sheik Ali Faris cave - Located about 2 kilometers North-East of Julis. In this cave Sheik Ali Faris resided and did his contemplation.

Notable people

 Amin Tarif
 Mowafaq Tarif
 Salah Tarif

See also
Arab localities in Israel
Druze in Israel
F.C. Julis

References

Bibliography

 Cited in Petersen, (2001) 

 
  
  
 Cited in Petersen, 2001.

External links
News website of Julis
Welcome To Julis
Survey of Western Palestine, Map 3:  IAA, Wikimedia commons 
Map, 1946

Arab localities in Israel
Druze communities in Israel
Local councils in Northern District (Israel)